Ponorogo can refer to:

 Ponorogo Regency, a regency of Indonesia
 Ponorogo (town) capital of Ponorogo Regency
 Reog or Reog Ponorogo, an art and culture in Ponorogo Regency, Indonesia